Schultzites is a genus of freshwater fish in the family Characidae. It contains the single species Schultzites axelrodi, which is endemic to Colombia, where it is found in the upper Meta River basin.

Schultzites Géry 1964 named in honor of Leonard P. Schultz (1901-1986), Curator of Fishes, U. S. National Museum, for his “tremendous ichthyological works”.

Schultzites axelrodi Géry 1964 was named in honor of pet-book publisher Herbert R. Axelrod (1927-2017), whose Tropical Fish Hobbyist magazine published this description and several others by Jacques Géry.

References
 

Characidae
Monotypic fish genera
Taxa named by Jacques Géry
Endemic fauna of Colombia
Freshwater fish of Colombia
Fish described in 1964